Nicolas Fauvergue (born 13 October 1984) is a retired French professional footballer who played as a forward.

Career
On 5 August 2009, RC Strasbourg signed Fauverge on loan from OSC Lille. On 23 June 2010, CS Sedan Ardennes signed him on loan for a year from OSC Lille, with a call option.

In June 2014, after winning the Ligue 2 with Metz in the previous season, he signed a two-year contract with relegated side AC Ajaccio.

On 28 August 2015, Fauvergue left AC Ajaccio in order to sign for Paris FC.

Honours
Lille
UEFA Intertoto Cup: 2004

References

External links
 
 

1984 births
Living people
People from Béthune
Sportspeople from Pas-de-Calais
Association football forwards
French footballers
France under-21 international footballers
Lille OSC players
RC Strasbourg Alsace players
CS Sedan Ardennes players
Stade de Reims players
FC Metz players
AC Ajaccio players
Ligue 1 players
Ligue 2 players
Footballers from Hauts-de-France